Usila is a Chinantec language of Mexico. It is most similar to Tlacoatzintepec Chinantec, with which it has 50% intelligibility (intelligibility in the reverse direction is 85%, presumably due to greater familiarity in that direction).

Like other Chinantecan and Mazatec languages, Usila Chinantec is a tonal language noted for having whistled speech. Its tone system is unusually finely graded, however, with five register tones and four contour tones.

References

Chinantec languages